Twins is an American sitcom television series that first aired on The WB in the United States and on CTV in Canada on September 16, 2005, and ended on March 3, 2006. The series is produced by KoMut Entertainment in association with Warner Bros. Television. The show was cancelled on May 18, 2006, unchosen to move onto The CW following the merger of The WB and UPN.

Synopsis
The show stars Sara Gilbert and Molly Stanton as sisters Mitchee and Farrah Arnold, who have taken over their parents' business. Together they make decisions about the future of their company while being supported by their father Alan and their overly plastic-surgeried mother Lee. The show's humor revolved around the differences between the nerdy Mitchee and the sexy Farrah.

The theme song for the show was "Sister Sister", performed by OK Go.

Cast
Sara Gilbert as Mitchee Arnold
Molly Stanton as Farrah Arnold
Chris Fitzgerald as Neil  
Melanie Griffith as Lee Arnold
Steve Braun as Jordan
Mark Linn-Baker as Alan Arnold

Episodes

References

External links
 

2000s American sitcoms
2005 American television series debuts
2006 American television series endings
English-language television shows
Television series about sisters
Television series about twins
Television series by Warner Bros. Television Studios
Television shows set in San Francisco
The WB original programming
Twins in fiction
Works about twin sisters